A Tribute to Oscar Peterson – Live at the Town Hall is a 1997 live album by Oscar Peterson, and featuring various artists paying tribute to Peterson.

Track listing
 "Anything Goes" (Cole Porter) – 5:20
 "Reunion Blues" (Milt Jackson) – 6:18
 "If You Only Knew" (Oscar Peterson) – 8:06
 "Bags' Groove" (Jackson) – 7:20
 "Willow Weep for Me" (Ann Ronell) – 6:44
 "Mumbles " (Clark Terry) – 4:00
 "I Can't Face the Music" (Rube Bloom, Ted Koehler) – 3:39
 "Here's to Life" (Artie Butler, Phyllis Molinary) – 5:05
 "In a Mellow Tone" (Duke Ellington, Milt Gabler) – 5:18
 "My Foolish Heart" (Ned Washington, Victor Young) – 5:15
 "The Duke of Dubuque" (William Faber, James Marchant, Lawrence Royal) – 2:07
 "(Get Your Kicks On) Route 66" (Bobby Troup) – 4:07
 "Mack the Knife" (Marc Blitzstein, Bertolt Brecht, Kurt Weill) – 7:25

Personnel

Performance
 Oscar Peterson – piano
 Benny Green – piano
 Shirley Horn – piano, vocal ("I Can't Face the Music", "Here's to Life")
 Stanley Turrentine – tenor saxophone 
 Roy Hargrove – flugelhorn
 Clark Terry – trumpet, vocal
 The Manhattan Transfer – vocal
 Milt Jackson – vibraphone
 Herb Ellis – guitar
 Ray Brown – double bass
 Niels-Henning Ørsted Pedersen
 Lewis Nash – drums

Production
 Anilda Carrasquillo – art direction, design
 Edward Gajdel – photography
 Jack Renner – engineer
 Tom Young – mixing
 Robert Woods – producer, executive producer
 Elaine Martone – producer
 Bob Blumenthal – liner Notes

References

Oscar Peterson live albums
1996 live albums
Telarc Records live albums